Gastonia is the largest city in and county seat of Gaston County, North Carolina, United States. It is the second-largest satellite city of the Charlotte area, behind Concord. The population was 80,411 at the 2020 census, up from 71,741 in 2010. Gastonia is the 13th most populous city in North Carolina. It is part of the Charlotte metropolitan area, officially designated the Charlotte Metropolitan Statistical Area (MSA).

The city is a historic center for textile manufacturing and was the site of the Loray Mill Strike of 1929, which became a key event in the labor movement. While manufacturing remains important to the local economy, the city also has well-developed healthcare, education, and government sectors.

History

Gastonia is named for William Gaston, a jurist and United States Representative from North Carolina.

The Loray Mill strike of 1929 in Gastonia was one of the most notable strikes in the labor history of the United States. The role of organizers for Communist Party-affiliated National Textile Workers Union (NTWU) alienated religious leaders in Gastonia, who denounced the organizers' ideology, undermining support for the strike. The strike collapsed after the death of Gastonia's police chief, Orville Alderholt, led to a murder trial of several militants including NTWU chief organizer Fred Beal. Beal was convicted in the killing but fled to the Soviet Union. The strike largely failed in attaining its goals of better working conditions and wages, and the American labor movement was never able to gain a foothold among textile workers in Gastonia. The strike, however, became for a while an international cause célèbre, figuring in several novels published in the 1930s.

National Register of Historic Places
The City Hospital-Gaston Memorial Hospital, Craig Farmstead, Downtown Gastonia Historic District, First National Bank Building, Gaston County Courthouse, Gastonia High School, David Jenkins House, Loray Mill Historic District, Robinson-Gardner Building, Third National Bank Building, and William J. Wilson House are listed on the National Register of Historic Places.

Geography

Gastonia occupies 14% of the total area of Gaston County.

Demographics

Population

2020 census

As of the 2020 United States census, there were 80,411 people, 27,796 households, and 18,361 families residing in the city.

2010 census
, there were 71,741 people, 27,770 households, and 18,599 families residing in the city. The population density was 1,420.6 people per square mile (548.5/km2). There were 31,238 housing units at an average density of 618.6 per square mile (238.8/km2). The racial composition of the city was 62.8% White, 27.5% Black or African American, 2.0% Asian, 0.4% Native American, 5.2% some other race, and 3.0% two or more races. 9.7% of the population were Hispanic or Latino American of any race.

As of the 2010 census, there were 27,770 households, out of which 34.7% had children under the age of 18 living with them, 42.5% were headed by married couples living together, 19.0% had a female householder with no husband present, and 33.0% were non-families. 27.1% of all households were made up of individuals, and 9.7% were someone living alone who was 65 years of age or older. The average household size was 2.52, and the average family size was 3.05.

In the city, the population was spread out, with 24.7% under the age of 18, 8.9% from 18 to 24, 26.5% from 25 to 44, 26.3% from 45 to 64, and 13.6% who were 65 years of age or older. The median age was 38.0 years. For every 100 females, there were 89.6 males. For every 100 females age 18 and over, there were 85.6 males.

In 2011 the estimated median income for a household in the city was $36,881, and the median income for a family was $44,576. Male full-time workers had a median income of $38,151 versus $29,590 for females. The per capita income for the city was $19,277. 20.9% of the population and 18.3% of families were below the poverty line. 32.5% of those under the age of 18 and 6.9% of those 65 and older were living below the poverty line.

Crime

Economy
Many shutdowns and job losses have plagued Gastonia over the past decade. Gastonia maintains a relatively strong manufacturing workforce, but many workers are laid off and many more are facing job losses. The city had an unemployment rate of 7.9% as of 2010; 12,536 of the 71,341 residents lived and worked in the city, with a daytime population change of +10,610. The city is the international corporate headquarters for textile company Parkdale Mills, the number one manufacturer of spun yarn in the world. The company also operated two production facilities in Gastonia and several in surrounding communities. Parkdale, like many other companies, has closed plants and moved production to other countries.

Other manufacturers in Gastonia include Wix Filtration Corp., Freightliner Trucks, Stabilus, Curtiss-Wright Controls Engineered Systems and Radici Group. Other major employers include the City of Gastonia and Gaston County governments, the Gaston County Schools system, CaroMont Regional Medical Center, and retailers Walmart and Advance Auto Parts, with two and six stores (plus a distribution center) respectively.

Arts and culture
Gastonia and the surrounding areas feature several notable attractions.

The Schiele Museum of Natural History features a number of permanent exhibits, including the Hall of North Carolina Natural History and the Henry Hall of the American Indian. The museum is also home to the James H. Lynn Planetarium, the only planetarium in the Charlotte area.

The Daniel Stowe Botanical Garden is located just southeast of the city in Belmont on NC 279.

The U.S. National Whitewater Center (on the Catawba River) is located east of the city in neighboring Mecklenburg County.

Crowders Mountain State Park is located west of the city, near Kings Mountain.  The park offers a number of hiking trails, as well as campgrounds, picnic areas, rock climbing, and fishing.

Shopping
Eastridge Mall, located at exit 20 on North New Hope Road, is the only indoor regional mall in the area; it is anchored by Belk and Dillard's. The mall is also home to over 80 specialty stores, a full-service food court, Red Lobster and other services.

Downtown Gastonia Historic District has undergone a revitalization with locally owned businesses including Webb Custom Kitchen, Gaston Pour House, Owl and Ivy, Java House, The Hive, Viva Tequis, Fannie Cakes Bakery, Pho Feel'n Asian Cuisine among many others. This has created a unique atmosphere of local shopping experiences with events centered around the community.

There are also a few more shopping centers across the city with other well-known national and local retailers.

Sports
The Gastonia Honey Hunters of the Atlantic League of Professional Baseball, a partner of Major League Baseball, will begin play in 2021 at FUSE District Stadium, which is part of an overall renewal project called the Franklin Urban Sports and Entertainment (FUSE) District.  Before the Honey Hunters' arrival, the Gastonia Grizzlies, a Coastal Plain League summer collegiate wood-bat team, played at Sims Legion Park.

The Gastonia Gargoyles play rugby at Gaston County's North Belmont Park. The team is part of the Carolinas Geographical Union (CGU) and plays Division IV men's social rugby. The club plays in the fall (August - November) and spring (Feb - May) seasons. The club also hosts an annual rugby 7's tournament in Clover, South Carolina, during the Clover Scottish Games on the first or second Saturday in June.

Gastonia's two roller derby teams are the G*Force (senior team) and Mini*Gs (junior team).  Bouts take place at Kate's Skating Rink on Hudson Blvd.

Government

Law enforcement
The city is served by the Gastonia Police Department, the Gaston County Police Department, and the Gaston County Sheriff's Office.

Fire and rescue
The Gastonia Fire Department consists of eight fire house spread throughout the communities within the City limits. The Gastonia Fire Department maintains 130 full-time firefighters working 3- to 24-hour shifts. The Life Safety division has a Fire Marshal and four inspectors, the Administration consists of the Fire Chief, Deputy Chief, Assistant Chief, Training Chief, and two Administrative assistants.
Gaston County EMS (GEMS) is the county ambulance service.

Education

K–12
All public K–12 schools in Gaston County, including the city of Gastonia, are part of the Gaston County Schools (GCS). GCS operates schools at the elementary, middle, and high school levels.

There are four public high schools in Gastonia: Ashbrook High School, Forestview High School, Hunter Huss High School, and Highland School of Technology. Students from outlying parts of Gastonia also attend Stuart W. Cramer High School, North Gaston High School, and Bessemer City High School.

Private schools are also available in the city. Gaston Day School, Gaston Christian School  are among various private schools offered in the Gastonia area.

Gastonia also has a charter school, Piedmont Community Charter School, that serves K–12 grade students. Currently the school has an Elementary campus along with a Secondary campus. A new High School campus is presently under construction. The new campus is set to open for the 2020–2021 school year.

College and university
Although there are no colleges or universities within the city limits of Gastonia, higher education is well represented in the greater Gastonia area. Gaston County is home to Belmont Abbey College (Belmont; four-year) and Gaston College (Dallas, Lincolnton (Lincoln County), and Belmont; two-year).

Library
The Gaston County Public Library has three locations in the city.

Media

Newspaper
The Gaston Gazette is Gastonia's main newspaper. It is published daily, and covers Gastonia city, Gaston County, and surrounding areas. The Charlotte Observer (North Carolina's largest newspaper) is also available, citywide.

Radio
Gastonia is served by numerous FM and AM radio stations, mainly based in nearby Charlotte. The city has one licensed AM station: WGNC 1450 AM; it has two licensed FM stations:  WGNC 101.1FM and WBAV 101.9 FM.

Infrastructure

Transportation

Highways and major city thoroughfares
Interstate 85 (I-85) links Gastonia directly with Charlotte, Greensboro, Durham, and Petersburg/Richmond (to the northeast) and Spartanburg, Greenville, Atlanta and Montgomery (to the southwest).

Gastonia is also served by three federal highways: US 29, US 74 (US 29 and US 74 follow the same route through the city), and US 321. US 29 parallels I-85 through the Carolinas, while US 74 provides direct east–west links to Charlotte and Wilmington (east), and Asheville and Cherokee (to the west).  US 321 links Gastonia to central South Carolina and the Blue Ridge Mountains in northwest North Carolina. State highways include: NC 7, NC 274, NC 275 and NC 279.

Franklin Boulevard, Garrison Boulevard, Hudson Boulevard and Ozark/Long/Airline/Gaston Avenues are major east–west city thoroughfares. New Hope Road, Chester Street/York Road, and Marietta Street/Dr. Martin Luther King, Jr. Way, are major north–south city thoroughfares.

Bus (local)

Gastonia Transit (GT) is Gastonia's city transit provider. The bus service operates on a fixed-route system covering most of the city and stops are clearly visible around town. Buses run Monday-Saturday, and transfer downtown Gastonia at the Bradley Station. Regular fare is $1.00, transfers are free.

Bus (regional)
Charlotte Area Transit System (CATS) is Gastonia's commuter provider to Charlotte. The Gastonia Express (Route 85X) offers Monday-Friday bus service to/from uptown Charlotte, via the Bradley Station. One-way fare to/from uptown Charlotte is $4.40; transfer is free when transferring to any other CATS services.

Bus (national)
Greyhound Lines serves the city. Alongside Gastonia Transit, Greyhound utilizes downtown's Bradley Station.

Rail (Amtrak)
Amtrak's Crescent (trains 19, 20) connects Gastonia (GAS) with the cities of (to the north) New York, Philadelphia, Baltimore, Washington, and Charlotte, and (to the south) Atlanta, Birmingham, and New Orleans. The unmanned Amtrak station is situated at 350 Hancock Street.

Airports
General service: 
Gastonia Municipal Airport (AKH) handles most of the city's private air service needs. It is located in the southeast part of the city on Gaston Day School Road, off NC 274 (Union Road).

Commercial service:
American Airlines has the airline's second largest hub operation at Charlotte.

Notable people

 Ernest Angley, televangelist
 Darrell Armstrong, NBA player
 R. B. Babington, businessman, telecommunications pioneer, banker, and alderman of Gastonia
 John T. Biggers, African-American muralist
 Cliff Cash, stand-up comedian
 Wiley Cash, author
 Clyde Caldwell, fantasy artist
 R. Gregg Cherry, 61st Governor of the state of North Carolina from 1945 to 1949
 Rufus Crawford, NFL and CFL player
 Crash Davis, Major League Baseball player who graduated from Gastonia HS; his name inspired that of the main character of the 1988 movie Bull Durham
 Glenn Dunaway, NASCAR driver
 Harold Dunaway, NASCAR driver
 Fred Durst, frontman and lyricist of the nu metal group Limp Bizkit
 Eric "Sleepy" Floyd, NBA player
 Jamie Fraley, missing woman
 Gary M. Green, musician, author, television host, gaming consultant and entrepreneur
 Leonard Hamilton, Florida State University men's basketball head coach; born in Gastonia and attended Gaston College
 Sylvia Hatchell, women's basketball coach (University of North Carolina at Chapel Hill)
 Wesley Ray "Wes" Helms, Major League Baseball player
 Lamar Holmes, NFL player
 Charlie Hughes, inventor and audio engineer
 Billy James, of radio talk show The John Boy and Billy Show
 Evan Karagias, wrestler and actor
 Buddy Lewis, Major League Baseball player
 Lillian M. Lowery, Superintendent of the Maryland State Department of Education, born in Gastonia
 Mel Melton, musician and chef
 Kevin Millwood, Major League Baseball pitcher
 Joe Pacheco, MMA fighter
 Buddy Parrott, NASCAR crew chief
 Ricky Rainey, UFC fighter
 Marshall Rauch, longest-serving Jewish state Senator in North Carolina history
 Diane Ray, singer of the early 1960s
 Mary Reynolds, baseball player in the All-American Girls Professional Baseball League
 Dave Robbins, college basketball coach and NCAA Hall of Fame member
 Koren Robinson, professional football player
 Lionel Shriver, author of We Need to Talk About Kevin
 Michal Smolen, slalom canoeist and Olympian
 Thomas Sowell, political commentator and economist; born in Gastonia, raised in New York City
 Melvin Stewart, former world record-holder in swimming who won two Olympic gold medals and one bronze
 Harold Varner III, professional golfer
 Hassan Whiteside, NBA player
 James Worthy, NBA player and member of Basketball Hall of Fame

Sister cities
Gastonia has two sister cities:
  Gotha, Thuringia, Germany 
  Santiago de Surco, Lima, Peru

Gotha was Gastonia's first sister city in 1994. Santiago de Surco became an official partner in March 2004. Mayor Jennie Stultz visited Gotha in 2007. In December 2007, the mayor of Santiago de Surco visited for the annual lighting of the Christmas tree in the Rotary Pavilion. He was invited to light the tree along with one of the city's councilmen.

See also

 List of municipalities in North Carolina
 Charlotte metropolitan area
 Garden Parkway
 Loray Mill Strike

References

External links

 
 

 
Cities in Gaston County, North Carolina
Cities in North Carolina
County seats in North Carolina